Jurijs Molotkovs (born 6 June 1974) is a retired Latvian football midfielder.

References

1974 births
Living people
Latvian footballers
Dinaburg FC players
FK Daugava (2003) players
FK Rīga players
FC Daugava players
Association football midfielders
Latvia international footballers